Sergio Pastore (1932-1987) was an Italian director and screenwriter best known for the giallo film Crimes of the Black Cat (1972).

References

External links

Italian film directors
Writers from Rome
20th-century Italian screenwriters
Italian male screenwriters
Italian film editors
1930 births
1987 deaths
20th-century Italian male writers